Jaanoo is a 1985 Indian Hindi-language film produced and directed by Jainendra Jain. It stars Jackie Shroff, Khushbu and Rati Agnihotri in pivotal roles. It was Kushboo’a official acting debut not only in Hindi cinemas, but in later South Indian industry- as she was previously seen in about 10-15 all Hindi movies as a child artist.

Plot

Cast
 Jackie Shroff as Ravi
 Khushbu as Bittu
 Rati Agnihotri as Kanchan
 Saeed Jaffrey as Shastri
 Sulabha Deshpande as Shantatai
 Anupam Kher as Mr. Mathur
 Beena Banerjee as Dr. Prabha
 Iftekhar as Dr. Prabha's senior

Music
"Chakdam Chakdam Pyar Hai" - Manhar Udhas, Anuradha Paudwal
"Jitna Kabhi Kisi Ne Kisi Ko" - Manhar Udhas, Anuradha Paudwal
"Sajan Tu Mujhe Utha Kar" - Anuradha Paudwal
"Chhodo Mujhko Chhodo" - Manhar Udhas
"Pappa Ki Baaton Ka (I)" - Rajeshwari, Manhar Udhas, Anuradha Paudwal
"Pappa Ki Baaton Ka (II)" - Manhar Udhas

External links

1980s Hindi-language films
1985 films
Films scored by Laxmikant–Pyarelal